A wicker man is a type of effigy.

The Wicker Man or Wickerman may refer to:

 The Wicker Man, a 1973 British horror film
 The Wicker Man (film series), which includes this film
 The Wicker Man (soundtrack), a soundtrack album from the 1973 film
 The Wicker Man (2006 film), an American remake of the 1973 film
 The Wicker Man (novel), a 1978 novel by Hardy & Shaffer
 "The Wicker Man" (song), a song by Iron Maiden
 "Wicker Man", a song by Bruce Dickinson from The Best of Bruce Dickinson
 "Wickerman", a song by Pulp from We Love Life
 Wickerman Festival, an annual rock and dance music event that takes place in Galloway, Scotland, UK
 Wicker Man (roller coaster), a wooden roller coaster at Alton Towers Resort, Staffordshire, UK

See also
Wickaman, drum and bass artist